Vermont Route 53 (VT 53) is a  state highway in central Vermont, United States. It is a town-maintained highway that extends from VT 73 in the Forest Dale section of Brandon north to U.S. Route 7 (US 7) in Salisbury. VT 53 is named Lake Dunmore Road and runs around the north and east of Lake Dunmore, passing Branbury State Park.

Route description
VT 53 begins at the junction with VT 73 in Forest Dale. The road continues north as North Street along the western edges of Mount Carmel State Forest, before bending to the northwest and then northeast as Lake Dunmore Road. After passing by Fern Lake to the west, VT 53 continues into the state forest, passing through Dunmore Acres and along the eastern shoreline of Lake Dunmore. At the north end of the lake, VT 53 turns to the west, leaving the forest and the lake shoreline as it ends at US 7.

VT 53 was heavily damaged by storms in 2008, with a bridge destroyed immediately south of Branbury State Park with no detour possible.

Major intersections

References

External links

053
Transportation in Addison County, Vermont
Transportation in Rutland County, Vermont